NGC 443 is a lenticular galaxy of type S0/(r)a? located in the constellation Pisces. It was first discovered on October 8, 1861 by Heinrich d'Arrest (and later listed as NGC 443), and was also spotted on October 17, 1903 by Stéphane Javelle (and later listed as IC 1653). It was described by Dreyer as "faint, small, round, 15th magnitude star 8 seconds of time to west on parallel (that is, at the same declination)."

References

External links
 

0443
18611008
Pisces (constellation)
Lenticular galaxies
004512